This was the first edition of the tournament for since 2012, Lu Yen-hsun won the title defeating Jürgen Zopp in the final 7–6(7–3), 6–1.

Seeds

Draw

Finals

Top half

Bottom half

References
 Main Draw
 Qualifying Draw

Ningbo Challenger - Singles